Elvira Quintillá (19 September 1928 – 27 December 2013) was a Spanish actress, whose career spanned over six decades.

Born in Barcelona, Catalonia, Quintillá began her acting career in 1941, appearing on stage. She married actor José María Rodero in 1947, and the couple remained together until Rodero's death in May 1991.

She died on 27 December 2013, aged 85, in Madrid, Community of Madrid.

Partial filmography

 Fin de curso (1943)
 Arribada forzosa (1944) - Isabel
 La gran barrera (1947)
 Historia de una escalera (1950) - Carmina
 Spanish Serenade (1951) - Magdalena
 Welcome Mr. Marshall! (1953) - Señorita Eloísa, la maestra
 That Happy Couple (1953) - Carmen González Fuentes
 Airport (1953) - Florista
 Concierto mágico (1953)
 Manicomio (1954) - Mercedes
 Juzgado permanente (1954) - Amparo
 La patrulla (1954) - Julie
 The Island Princess (1954) - Tasirga
 La hermana alegría (1955) - Isabel
 El guardián del paraíso (1955) - Cecilia
 Un día perdido (1955) - Hermana Matilde
 Viaje de novios (1956) - Merche
 La frontera del miedo (1958) - Azafata
 Los tramposos (1959) - Mujer de Don Arturo
 La rana verde (1960) - Elvira
 For Men Only (1960) - Felisa
 Green Harvest (1961)
 Plácido (1961) - Emilia
 Aprendiendo a morir (1962) - Ángeles
 The Executioner (1963) - (uncredited)
 Eva 63 (1963) - Eugenia
 Fin de semana (1964) - Ángela
 El cálido verano del Sr. Rodríguez (1965)
 Lola, espejo oscuro (1966) - Mujer de Tomás
 Operación Plus Ultra (1966) - Madre de Mari Carmen
 El abuelo tiene un plan (1973) - Laura
 En la cresta de la ola (1975) - Celia
 Con mucho cariño (1977)
 La colmena (1982) - Doña Visitación
 The Autonomines (1983) - Faustina
 A la pálida luz de la luna (1985) - Teresa
 Nosotros en particular (1985) - Doña Rosaura

References

External links

1928 births
2013 deaths
People from Barcelona
Spanish television actresses
Spanish film actresses
Spanish stage actresses